Manasia is a commune located in Ialomița County, Muntenia, Romania. It is composed of a single village, Manasia.

The commune is located in the wester part of the country, on the left bank of the Ialomița River. It is crossed by the DN2A road that connects the city of Urziceni ( to the west), to the county seat, Slobozia ( to the east).

People
 Constantin Budescu, midfielder for Astra Giurgiu and Steaua Bucuresti.

References

Communes in Ialomița County
Localities in Muntenia